NGC 3199 is an emission nebula in the constellation Carina. It is commonly known as the Banana Nebula. The object was discovered in 1826 by the Scottish astronomer James Dunlop. It was thought to be the bow shock around the central star, WR 18, an especially hot and luminous Wolf–Rayet star; however, it was determined that the nebula formed due to the composition of local space, not because of the star's movement.

See also 
 List of NGC objects

References

External links

Emission nebulae
H II regions
3199
Carina (constellation)
3199